Claire Pommet (born 2 August 1996), known professionally as Pomme, is a French singer, songwriter, and musician. Born and raised in Lyon, France, she learned to play several instruments at a young age. Her debut studio album, À peu près (2017), received critical acclaim for its mixture of pop and folk music and entered the French album charts at number 91. Pomme followed with her second studio album, Les failles (2019), which became her first project to reach the top 10 in her home country. The record was later reissued as Les failles cachées (2020) and re-entered record charts in two countries. Her third studio album, Consolation, was released on 26 August 2022.

Life and career

1996–2012: Early life 

Claire Pommet was born on 2 August 1996 in Décines-Charpieu but grew up in Caluire-et-Cuire, a French town in the metropolis of Lyon. She learned music theory with her three siblings from the age of 6, joined a children's choir, La Cigale de Lyon, at age 7, and learned to play the cello at age 8. Her mother plays the flute while her father, a real estate agent, listened to Michel Polnareff, Serge Reggiani, and Charles Aznavour. One of her father's friends introduced her to American folk and country music. She is self-taught and publishes videos on the YouTube web platform.

2013–2015: Career beginnings and En cavale 
Pommet's stage name "Pomme", which derives from her last name, was a nickname used by her friends at university. In early 2015, Pomme was signed to Polydor Records and began working on her debut extended play (EP) En cavale. 2016 She released her debut single "J'suis pas dupe" in June 2015. Following the EP's release in January 2016, it received a positive reception and was promoted with music videos and concerts.

2016–2017: À peu près 
In September 2017, aged 21, she performed for the first time at La Boule Noire in Paris. In October she released her first chanson française album, titled À peu près; it was described as a mixture of pop and folk by Salome Rouzerol-Douglas in Le Figaro. It was "very encouraging" according to Gilles Renault in Libération. At the same time, Marie-Catherine Mardi of RFI said that "the lyrics do not convince [in their entirety]" but praised Pommet's voice. Despite the acclaim received, Pomme expressed frustration towards the album since she felt trapped by "the desire to please [others] more" instead of herself. She performed in the first part of the Asaf Avidan tour in autumn 2017.

2018–2020: Les failles 
In February 2018, she performed at the Café de la Danse in Paris, after having performed as an opening act for Louane and Vianney, then took the stage in La Cigale in mid-2018 and in La Trianon in early 2019. In 2019, she released her second studio album Les failles (2019), which was later reissued a year later. Described by Pomme as an album with "absolute truth and humility", she conceived it while reflecting on a breakup. In February 2020, she won the Victoires de la Musique award for album révélation ("newcomer album") of the year with Les failles. The singer later released the EP Quarantine Phone Sesssions in May 2020, which she stated to be available only during the COVID-19 lockdowns.

2021–present: Consolation 
In 2021, she was crowned artiste féminine ("female artist") of the year. On New Year's Day, Pomme revealed plans of releasing a third studio album in 2022 through her Twitter account. Later in that month, her collaboration "Everything Matters" with Norwegian singer-songwriter Aurora was released as a single from the latter's third studio album, The Gods We Can Touch (2022). In May 2022, she published the children's book Sous les paupières with French singer Pauline de Tarragon, who also did the illustrations.

Artistry 
Pomme's music incorporates chanson française, folk-pop, French pop and indie folk. The journalists of Libération and Le Figaro emphasized the quality of Pomme's live performances, during which she particularly plays the autoharp and the guitar. The lyrics she writes often evoke themes of love, death, and "everyday situations that resort to romanticism". Love in her lyrics is not only heterosexual but also bisexual or homosexual; she has dedicated a song to Quebec singer Safia Nolin, who used to be her partner. Other topics she explored are intimacy, feminism, and environmentalism, which she considered to be "natural and obvious to me for my generation and for myself."

Pomme noted that despite being heavily influenced by folk music, she has also listened to pop musicians. She cited French singers Barbara, Édith Piaf and Lorie as her primary influences, with Barbara and Lorie being singers she listened to during her childhood and youth. Other influences include Lady Gaga, Lizzo, Celine Dion, Lily Allen, Camélia Jordana, Cœur de Pirate,  Keaton Henson, Aldous Harding, Feist, Sufjan Stevens, Mylène Farmer, Dolly Parton and Kate Nash. Vogue France called her appearance "a fairy-like look straight out of a Tim Burton movie," with Pomme calling Burton's film Charlie and the Chocolate Factory and its protagonist Willy Wonka as style icons for her. She was also inspired by French poet Paul Éluard and feminist works and comics.

Personal life 
Pomme explained in an interview with Télérama: "I am naturally comfortable with my homosexuality, for example, using female pronouns in my songs. And I think it's important, given the amount of thank-you messages I get. As a teenager, I would have also liked to recognize myself in lesbian singers". For the 2020 municipal elections in Lyon, she made public her support for the Europe Écologie Les Verts party. In February 2021, in support of the MeToo movement, Pomme stated that she had been "manipulated and morally and sexually harassed" from age 15 to 17.

Discography

Studio albums

Reissues

Extended plays

Singles

As lead artist

As featured artist

Guest appearances

Music videos

 Director information obtained from each video description on YouTube.

Bibliography 
 Sous les paupières (2022) (with Pauline de Tarragon)

References

External links

Official website

Living people
1996 births
21st-century French women singers
French women songwriters
French lesbian musicians
French LGBT singers
French LGBT songwriters
People from Décines-Charpieu
Autoharp players
Lesbian singers
Lesbian songwriters